

October 2015

See also

References 

 10
October 2015 events in the United States